Reyhaniye can refer to:
 Reyhanlı, a town in the Turkish province of Antakya
 Rehaniya, a village in northern Israel